Carmen's Crew are an American basketball team that has participated in The Basketball Tournament (TBT), an annual winner-take-all single-elimination tournament. The team first played in the tournament in 2017 under the name Scarlet & Gray, and won the championship (and $2 million prize) in 2019. The team's roster consists of professional basketball players who compete outside of the NBA, most of whom played college basketball for the Ohio State Buckeyes men's basketball team. The TBT team is an independent entity that was previously named after the college team's colors (scarlet and gray), and is currently named after Ohio State's school song ("Carmen Ohio"). The team last competed in the 2021 edition of TBT.

History

2017 
During TBT 2017, team competed under the name Scarlet & Gray, and were the no. 2 seed in the Midwest Region.

Roster

2018 
During TBT 2018, team again competed under the name Scarlet & Gray, and were the no. 1 seed in the Midwest Region.

Roster

2019 
For TBT 2019, team adopted the Carmen's Crew name, and were the no. 1 seed in the Columbus Regional.

Roster

2020 
For TBT 2020, the defending champions were the no. 1 overall seed in a reduced field of 24 teams.

Roster

2021 
For TBT 2021, the team was seeded no. 1 in the Columbus Regional.

Roster

Record by years

Awards

References

External links 
 Team page

Basketball teams in the United States
The Basketball Tournament teams
Basketball teams established in 2017
Ohio State Buckeyes men's basketball